The Freedom 251 is a smartphone that was initially offered for sale in India at the promotional price of ₹251 (the equivalent of $3.39 as of 2022). Sold by Ringing Bells Private Limited, and marketed as the world's cheapest smartphone.

Bharatiya Janata Party MP Kirit Somaiya has stated that the phone is bogus and the promotion is a Ponzi scheme. He filed a complaint which led to a first information report (FIR) being registered against Ringing Bells Director Mohit Goel and company president Ashok Chaddha under Section 420 of the Indian Penal Code (IPC) as well as the Information Technology Act. However, the Allahabad High Court stayed the FIR as premature.

Promotion

The promotional price was offered for a limited time only to online bookings between 18 and 21 February 2016. Traffic was so high on the website that it crashed on the first day. The company says that the regular price will be about ₹500 (US$7.47 as of 31 August 2016).

The company planned to sell 5 million phones by June 2016. At the point its website crashed, it had taken bookings for only 30,000 at the Rs 251 price.  By the time bookings closed, Ringing Bells claimed they had taken bookings worth Rs 17.5 million (over US$261,000 as of August 2016).

Money refund 
Ringing Bells had promised to provide refunds to 30,000 customers who pre-booked the Freedom 251 on the first day of the sale. The company stated  that the refunds should have reached customers during the first week of March 2016.

The company has said that negative speculation around the Rs 251 smartphone has led them to take the step, and that customers who have booked the phone will now pay only after the smartphone is delivered to them.

Controversies and criticism 
The Indian Cellular Association (ICA) has doubted that a smartphone can realistically be sold at a price as low as Rs 251 and have asked the Telecom Minister, Ravi Shankar Prasad, to intervene. According to the ICA, even with a subsidized sale, the selling price should not be less than Rs 3,500 (US$52.28 as of 31 August 2016). The ICA also complained that senior members of the government had been present at the product launch.

The prototype showcased and handed out to media at the time of launch were rebadged Adcom devices, for which Adcom threatened to sue Ringing Bells. But units circulated later were totally different from the original prototype.

According to Narayanan Madhavan writing in the Hindustan Times, a price of Rs 251 is possible only through deals with advertising partners.  Such deals would only be possible once a very large number of handsets were in use.

On 20 February 2016, the offices of Ringing Bells were raided by government officials investigating why the product does not have a Bureau of Indian Standards certification.

Some commentators indicate that the Freedom 251 sale is a scam. The phone looks like a Chinese phone where the original brand label was covered with whitener. The icons shown on screen shots are copied from Apple's iPhone. There are also reports that many people ordered the phone but did not even receive a confirmation email.  Bharatiya Janata Party MP Kirit Somaiya described Ringing Bells as "a Ponzi bogus company scam".  He has requested that the Telecom Ministry, the Telecom Regulatory Authority of India, and various other ministries investigate the company.  As a result of these concerns, the payment gateway facilitator PayUBiz decided to withhold payment to Ringing Bells until the items were dispatched.

The Telecom Ministry after conducting an internal assessment on the phone found that it could not be offered for less than Rs. 2,300 - 2,400 ($34.36-$35.85 USD as of 31 August 2016).

Ringing Bells has also been accused of fraud and non-payment of dues by its customer services provider Cyfuture. 

Goel was later arrested by Indian authorities over the aforementioned fraud allegations, after the owner of Ghaziabad-based Ayam Enterprises filed an FIR alleging that Ringing Bells “defrauded” it of Rs. 16 lakh.

Currently, the domain has been expired and Godaddy has auctioned it. On March 24, 2019, the new owner has converted it into a Tech blog.

Delivery 
Ringing Bells says it had delivered 5,000 units of Freedom 251 by 9 July 2016, and claimed to be delivering another 65,000 units to customers.

References 

Android (operating system) devices
Mobile phones introduced in 2016
Telecommunications in India
Pyramid and Ponzi schemes
False advertising